Wohlfahrtia is a genus of flesh flies in the family Sarcophagidae. There are at least 20 described species in Wohlfahrtia.

Species
These 28 species belong to the genus Wohlfahrtia:

Wohlfahrtia africana Verves, 1985
Wohlfahrtia aschersoni (Enderlein, 1934)
Wohlfahrtia atra Aldrich, 1926 c g
Wohlfahrtia balassogloi (Portschinsky, 1881)
Wohlfahrtia bella (Macquart, 1839) c g
Wohlfahrtia brevicornis Cha & Zhang, 1996 c g
Wohlfahrtia brunnipalpis (Macquart, 1851) c g
Wohlfahrtia cheni Rohdendorf, 1956
Wohlfahrtia erythrocera Villeneuve, 1910 c g
Wohlfahrtia fedtschenkoi Rohdendorf, 1956
Wohlfahrtia grunini Rohdendorf, 1969
Wohlfahrtia hirtiparafacialis Cha & Zhang, 1996 c g
Wohlfahrtia ilanramoni Lehrer, 2003 c g
Wohlfahrtia indigens Villeneuve, 1928
Wohlfahrtia intermedia (Portschinsky, 1887)
Wohlfahrtia magnifica (Schiner, 1861)
Wohlfahrtia nuba (Wiedemann, 1830) c g
Wohlfahrtia pachytyli (Townsend, 1919)
Wohlfahrtia pavlovskyi Rohdendorf, 1956
Wohlfahrtia seguiy Salem, 1938 c g
Wohlfahrtia smarti Salem, 1938
Wohlfahrtia spinisternum Pape & Zhang, 2018
Wohlfahrtia stackelbergi Rohdendorf, 1956
Wohlfahrtia trina (Wiedemann, 1830) c g
Wohlfahrtia vigil (Walker, 1849) i c g b (fox maggot)
Wohlfahrtia villeneuvi Salem, 1938

Data sources: i = ITIS, c = Catalogue of Life, g = GBIF, b = Bugguide.net

References

Further reading

External links

 

Sarcophagidae
Articles created by Qbugbot